Kranzhorn is a mountain in Tirol, Austria and Bavaria, Germany.

Mountains of Bavaria
Chiemgau Alps
Mountains of the Alps